The 2022 NAB League Boys season is the 30th season of the NAB League Boys competition for under-19 male Australian rules footballers in Victoria. The season commenced on 2 April and will conclude with the Grand Final on 17 September.

Format
The league consisted of 13 full-time teams (12 from Victoria and 1 from Tasmania) that competed in a 13-round home and away season. Following the regular season, the top three teams had a bye and the remaining 10 teams contested a wildcard round to determine positions four to eight. The top eight teams then competed in a three-week knockout finals series, which culminated in the Grand Final between the two winning teams from the preliminary finals. Five academy teams (Brisbane Lions Academy, Gold Coast Suns Academy, Sydney Swans Academy, GWS Giants Academy and Northern Territory Thunder) participated in three-to-four matches during the season, though were not eligible for finals matches.

Ladder

See also
 2022 NAB League Girls season

References

External links
 Season results (Play HQ)

NAB League
Nab League Boys